Hillerman is an unincorporated community in Massac County, Illinois, United States.

References

Unincorporated communities in Massac County, Illinois
Unincorporated communities in Illinois